Dunville's Three Crowns was a rare pure pot still whiskey distilled by Dunville & Co at the Royal Irish Distillery in Belfast. Though similar to Dunville's other whiskey Dunville's VR, Three Crowns was distilled longer and used more sherry casks for the maturing process.

The Echlinville Distillery
Dunville's Three Crowns Irish Whiskey and Dunville's VR Old Irish Whiskey are now being produced at the Echlinville Distillery in Kircubbinin, County Down, and came on the market in 2016.

References

External links
The Dunville Family of Northern Ireland and Dunville's Whisky

Irish whiskey